More of the Great Lorez Alexandria is an album by American jazz vocalist Lorez Alexandria featuring performances recorded in 1964 for the Impulse! label.

Reception

The AllMusic review awarded the album 4½ stars.

Track listing
 "But Beautiful" (Johnny Burke, Jimmy van Heusen) - 4:18 
 "Little Boat (O Barquinho)" (Ronaldo Boscoli, Roberto Menescal) - 2:17 
 "Dancing on the Ceiling" (Lorenz Hart, Richard Rodgers) - 1:32 
 "It Might as Well Be Spring" (Oscar Hammerstein II, Rodgers) - 6:58 
 "Once (It S'Aim Aient)" (Norman Gimbel, Guy Magenta, Eddy Marney) - 2:20 
 "The Wildest Gal in Town" (Sammy Fain, Jack Yellen) - 2:54 
 "Angel Eyes" (Earl Brent, Matt Dennis) - 4:53 
 "This Could Be the Start of Something Big" (Steve Allen) - 2:20 
 "No More" (Tutti Camarata, Bob Russell) - 3:09 
 "That Far Away Look" (Marilyn Bergman, Alan Bergman, Fain) - 2:25 
Recorded in New York City in 1964

Personnel
Lorez Alexandria - vocals, finger pops
Paul Horn - flute, alto saxophone
Wynton Kelly - piano
Ray Crawford - guitar
Al McKibbon - bass
Jimmy Cobb - drums
Unidentified orchestra led by Toots Camarata

References

Impulse! Records albums
Lorez Alexandria albums
1964 albums